Its first European competition participation occurred in 1973–74 season in UEFA European Cup as the Soviet representative. Zorya played its first game as Zaria at its home stadium Avanhard (Avangard) on September 19, 1973, hosting the Cypriot club APOEL. After that season, the club did not participate in continental competitions for over 40 years until 2014–15 season.

Statistics by country

Tally per competition

Results

Notes
 1R: First round
 2R: Second round
 2Q: Second qualifying round
 3Q: Third qualifying round
 PO: Play-off round

Europe
Ukrainian football clubs in international competitions
Soviet football clubs in international competitions